XHVAL-FM is a radio station in Valle de Bravo on 104.5 MHz, owned by the government of the State of Mexico. It is part of the Radio Mexiquense state radio network.

XHVAL was added in 2008 as part of an expansion of Radio Mexiquense with four new FM stations.

References

Radio stations established in 2008
Radio stations in the State of Mexico
Public radio in Mexico